Hombre Lobo: 12 Songs of Desire is the seventh studio album by American rock band Eels, released on June 2, 2009. Hombre Lobo is Spanish for "werewolf". On March 31, 2009, the band made the track "Fresh Blood" available on Spinner.com, explaining that the song would be the lead single for the album. A documentary entitled Tremendous Dynamite was filmed to document the recording of the album. The cover art is a tribute to the famous Cuban cigar brand Cohiba.

Composition
The songs form a concept album about desire. As frontman Mark Oliver "E" Everett explained, "I wanted to write a set of songs about desire. That dreadful, intense want that gets you into all sorts of situations that can change your life in big ways." In part, the album was inspired by E's facial hair and written as a sequel to the Souljacker song "Dog Faced Boy". The character of "Dog Faced Boy" has grown up into a werewolf and is the protagonist who experiences various types of desire throughout the songs. In an interview with NPR on June 6, 2009, Everett stated, "That Look You Give That Guy" is his favorite song from the album.

In contrast to 2005's Blinking Lights and Other Revelations, Everett tried to compose more straightforward rock songs for Hombre Lobo.

Hombre Lobo is the first in a trilogy of three concept albums continuing with the 2010 albums End Times and Tomorrow Morning.

Release history
The album was released as a single CD in Europe on Polydor/Vagrant, an enhanced CD with the Tremendous Dynamite documentary in the United States through E Works/Vagrant, a deluxe edition CD with a DVD, and a limited-edition vinyl LP with gold embossing with a print run of 2,000. It is also sold digitally from the iTunes Store; pre-ordered copies receive a copy of the music video for "Prizefighter".

Marketing
Prior to the album's release, Eels promoted it with music videos for "Fresh Blood" (premiered April 29), "That Look You Give That Guy" (May 14), "Prizefighter", and "In My Dreams" (July 7). The band also briefly used a Twitter account to generate hype for the album.

The live EP The Myspace Transmissions Session 2009 was also released to promote the album.

"Fresh Blood" was used in the June 2010 trailer for the third season of HBO's True Blood, as well as the ending credits of episode 11, season 3. It was also used as the closing song for the season 6 premiere episode of FX's series Rescue Me. It was also used as the theme song for the HBO docu-series The Jinx.

Critical reception

The album has a score of 70/100 on Metacritic, indicating "generally positive reviews". One negative review of the album came again from Pitchfork, who gave the album 4.6 out of 10.

Track listing
All songs written by E and Kelly Logsdon, except where noted
"Prizefighter" – 2:53
"That Look You Give That Guy" – 4:15
"Lilac Breeze" (E) – 2:36
"In My Dreams" – 3:22
"Tremendous Dynamite" – 2:46
"The Longing" (E) – 4:22
"Fresh Blood" – 4:25
"What's a Fella Gotta Do" – 3:25
"My Timing Is Off" (E) – 2:58
"All the Beautiful Things" (E) – 2:22
"Beginner's Luck" – 3:37
"Ordinary Man" (E) – 3:15

Personnel

Eels
Derek Brown – drums
E – vocals and guitar
Kelly Logsdon – bass guitar

Production
Autumn de Wilde – photography
E – production
Lisa Glines – design
Dan "Huevos Grande" Hersch, Digiprep Mastering – mastering
Koool G Murder – recording and mixing
Dan Pinder – recording and mixing

Charts

Weekly charts

Year-end charts

Certifications

References

External links

2009 albums
Concept albums
Eels (band) albums
Polydor Records albums
Vagrant Records albums
Albums produced by Mark Oliver Everett
Werewolves in music